This is a list of properties and districts in Fulton County, Georgia that are listed on the National Register of Historic Places (NRHP).  It covers most of the NRHP properties in Atlanta; other Atlanta listings are covered in National Register of Historic Places listings in DeKalb County, Georgia.

Current listings

|}

Former listings

|}

See also

National Register of Historic Places listings in Georgia (U.S. state)
List of National Historic Landmarks in Georgia (U.S. state)

References

Fulton
Buildings and structures in Fulton County, Georgia